Precision, precise or precisely may refer to:

Science, and technology, and mathematics

Mathematics and computing (general)
 Accuracy and precision, measurement deviation from true value and its scatter
 Significant figures, the number of digits that carry real information about a measurement 
 Precision and recall, in information retrieval: the proportion of relevant documents returned
 Precision (computer science), a measure of the detail in which a quantity is expressed
 Precision (statistics), a model parameter or a quantification of precision

Computing products
 Dell Precision, a line of Dell workstations
 Precision Architecture, former name for PA-RISC, a reduced instruction set architecture developed by Hewlett-Packard
 Ubuntu 12.04 "Precise Pangolin", Canonical's sixteenth release of Ubuntu

Companies
 Precision Air, an airline based in Tanzania
 Precision Castparts Corp., a casting company based in Portland, Oregon, in the United States  
 Precision Drilling, the largest drilling-rig contractor in Canada
 Precision Monolithics, an American company that produced linear semiconductors
 Precision Talent, a voice-over talent-management company
 F.E. Baker Ltd, maker of Precision motorcycle and cycle-car engines pre-WW1
 Precisely (company), formerly Syncsort

Other
 Precision Club, a bidding system in the game of contract bridge
 Precision (march), the official marching music of the Royal Military College of Canada
 Precision 15, a self-bailing dinghy
 Fender Precision Bass, by Fender Musical Instruments Corporation
 Precisely (sketch), a dramatic sketch by the English playwright Harold Pinter

See also

 Precisionism, an artistic movement also known as Cubist Realism
 Precisionist (1981–2006), an American Hall of Fame Thoroughbred racehorse